is a video game developed by HummingBirdSoft and published by Matsushita for the 3DO. The game was released exclusively in Japan in 1994 as part of the Ghost Hunter dungeon crawler series, which also includes Laplace no Ma and Paracelsus no Maken from the same developer.

Gameplay 
Kurokishi no Kamen is a graphic adventure game involving various characters (ghost hunters, a detective, a scientist, a mystic, and a journalist) exploring a haunted house.

Reception 

Next Generation reviewed the game as "Ghost Hunter", rating it three stars out of five, and stated that "it's important to being mention that, being from Japan, it's entirely in Japanese. If you don't understand the language, you won't get very far, but if you even understand a little, it's definitely worth it."

Notes

References

External links 
 Kurokishi no Kamen at GameFAQs
 Kurokishi no Kamen at Giant Bomb

1994 video games
3DO Interactive Multiplayer games
3DO Interactive Multiplayer-only games
Dungeon crawler video games
Japan-exclusive video games
Video games about ghosts
Video games based on anime and manga
Video games developed in Japan